Garra ignestii is a species of ray-finned fish in the genus Garra. It is endemic to Ethiopia, occurring only in the drainages of the Tekezé River and the Abbay River in the north of that country.

References

Garra
Fish of Ethiopia
Endemic fauna of Ethiopia
Fish described in 1925